Eric Knowles FRSA (born 19 February 1953 in Nelson, Lancashire, England) is a British antiquarian and television personality, whose main interests are in ceramics and glass.

Early life
Knowles joined the London auction house Bonhams as a porter in the ceramics department in 1976 and became head of the department in 1981. By 1992 he had set up Bonham's offices in Bristol. He returned to London to continue with directing the Decorative Arts Department, leaving in 2013 to join Dreweatts and Bloomsbury. In 2019 he joined The Hoard as executive chairman and has now opened a gallery, The Pantiles Arcade, in Corn Exchange on The Pantiles in Royal Tunbridge Wells, although this was postponed until Spring 2021.

Television career
He first earned fame as a ceramics expert on the BBC's Antiques Roadshow. He has also appeared in such programmes as, Going for a Song, Going, Going, Gone, Noel's House Party, Call My Bluff and 20th Century Roadshow. He has presented the 20 episodes of Restoration Roadshow on BBC for several weeks in the summer of 2010 (ending 3 September). He is the challenger setter and adjudicator on BBC Two's Antiques Master assisting host Sandi Toksvig. As of 2012, he is on the UK TV show Put Your Money Where Your Mouth Is. After Tim Wonnacott left Bargain Hunt, Knowles became one of a number of 'guest presenters' hosting the show. He also appeared in the series Clash of the Collectables, which he co-hosted with Alan Carter.

Personal life
Knowles is a Fellow of the Royal Society of Arts and an Ambassador for the Prince's Trust. Knowles is associated with several other charities including Headway, FABLE (For a better life with epilepsy), the New Mozart Orchestra and Wycombe Scanappeal. He has lectured at the Victoria & Albert Museum, the British Museum, and important national museums in Australia, Canada, the US, South Africa, France, Germany, and the Czech Republic.

Knowles had the Freedom of the City of London bestowed in 2000.

He is a published author on subjects such as Victoriana, Royal memorabilia, Art Nouveau, Art Deco, and René Lalique.

His son Seb was killed in a road accident in May 2015.

References

External links
Scottishantiques.com

1953 births
Living people
Antiques experts
People from Nelson, Lancashire